Priya Shah the matchmaker an Indian marriage bureau or matrimonial service. It was founded by Priya Shah in 1991 with headquarters in Mumbai, India. It presently operates globally with offices in Canada, United Arab Emirates, United Kingdom, Africa, Australia, Singapore and United States.

History
In 1991 Priya Shah started a speed dating matrimonial get-together in Mumbai under one roof of 200 families together. She founded a marriage bureau and named it Priya Shah the matchmaker. Later, their services were expanded abroad. In 2015, the company received the Best Match Maker Award in Dubai. The company claims that they have done 9,000 successful matches since its founding in 1991.

References 

Matchmaking
Indian matrimonial websites